The 2004 Ball State Cardinals football team represented Ball State University during the 2004 NCAA Division I-A football season. The Cardinals were led by second-year head coach Brady Hoke and played their home games at Ball State Stadium as members of the West Division of the Mid-American Conference (MAC). They finished the season 2–9, 2–6 in MAC play to finish in fifth place in the West Division.

Schedule

References

Ball State
Ball State Cardinals football seasons
Ball State Cardinals football